Viedma Glacier is a large glacier that is part of the huge Southern Patagonian Ice Field, located at the southern end of mainland South America. Viedma Glacier is a valley glacier and its moraine-rich terminus flows into the western end of Lake Viedma, which is fed primarily by its melting ice. Viedma Glacier is located in the undefined part of the limit between Chile and Argentina, in Argentinian legislature it is in Los Glaciares National Park which was declared a World Heritage Site in 1981. in Chilean legislature part of it is in Bernardo O'Higgins National Park.

Glacier terminus
Chunks of ice fall off the  terminus and float off into the lake, eventually melting. Glacial moraines are glacial debris of soil and rock that collect in front of, and along the sides of, the glacier as it flows across the land.

The dark parallel lines inside  the white central mass of the  Viedma Glacier show where the debris-filled moraines have become entwined within the center of the new glacial ice mass as it forms. At right angles to the glacial moraines in the middle, crevasses, large, canyon-sized cracks,  are apparent in the grey-brown ice that can be seen along the sides of the glacier. These cracks are formed from the  stress arising between ice along the valley walls (that is slower moving as the friction is greater) and the relatively fast moving ice at the glacier's center. On the southwestern side of the glacier terminus, calving of ice is visible. The glacier terminus ends in a cliff.

Notes

External links
 
 

Glaciers of Chile
Glaciers of Magallanes Region
Landforms of Santa Cruz Province, Argentina
Glaciers of Argentina